Manuel dos Santos can refer to:

Manuel António dos Santos (1943–), Portuguese politician
Manuel dos Santos (footballer) (1974–), French footballer
Manuel dos Santos (swimmer) (1939–), Brazilian swimmer

See also
Garrincha (1933–1983), real name Manuel Francisco dos Santos, Brazilian footballer